Potchefstroom, colloquially known as  Potch, is an academic city in the North West Province of South Africa. It hosts the Potchefstroom Campus of the North-West University.

Etymology
Several theories exist about the origin of the city's name. According to one theory, it originates from Potgieter + Chef + stroom (referring to Voortrekker leader and town founder Andries Potgieter; "chef" indicates the leader of the Voortrekkers, and "stroom" refers to the Mooi River).

Geoffrey Jenkins writes, "Others however, attribute the name as having come from the word 'Potscherf', meaning a shard of a broken pot, due to the cracks that appear in the soil of the Mooi River Valley during drought resembling a broken pot". M. L. Fick suggests that Potchefstroom developed from the abbreviation of "Potgieterstroom" to "Potgerstroom", which became "Potchefstroom". However, this does not account for the appearance of "Potjestroom" on many documents and photographs.

The African National Congress decided to change the name of the municipality and some street names in 2006, favouring "Tlokwe" as the new name. In 2007, its name was changed from Potchefstroom Municipality to Tlokwe Municipality. However, the city continued to use the name Potchefstroom. The Tlowke Municipality merged with the Ventersdorp Municipality in 2016, forming the larger JB Marks Local Municipality.

History
Potchefstroom, founded in 1838 by the Voortrekkers, is the second-oldest European settlement in the Transvaal. Some historians challenge this, because the first settlement was in the "upper regions of the Schoon Spruit" (believed to have been between Klerksdorp and Potchefstroom). However, Potchefstroom was the first to develop into a town.

Until 1840, the towns of Potchefstroom and Winburg and their surrounding territories were a Boer Republic known as the Republic of Winburg-Potchefstroom. Voortrekker leader Andries Hendrik Potgieter was elected as chief commandant. In October 1840, after a meeting between Potgieter, Andries Pretorius and G. R. van Rooyen, it was decided that Potchefstroom would unite with "Pieter Mouriets Burg" (Pietermaritzburg).

On 16–17 January 1852, the Sand River Convention was signed between Andries Pretorius (representing the Boers) and Major W. S. Hogge and C. M. Owen (representing Britain). According to the convention, the British government would allow the immigrant farmers north of the Vaal River to govern themselves with no interference from either side. This signalled the establishment of the Zuid-Afrikaanse Republiek (ZAR) (South African Republic). In Article 17 of the Constitution of the ZAR dated 18 February 1858 (which was accepted in Rustenburg), it was stated that "Potchefstroom, located on the Mooi River, would be the capital of the Republic and that Pretoria would be the seat of government". In May 1860, Potchefstroom became the "chief city" of the republic and the capital moved to Pretoria.

On 16 December 1880, the First Boer War began when the Boers laid siege to the old fort. The siege ended amicably on 23 March 1881. The British built concentration camps during the Second Boer War for Boer women, children, and elderly men, where more than 27,000 died of starvation and disease.

At the opening of the city hall in 1909, colonial secretary Jan Smuts was asked about the possibility of Potchefstroom becoming capital of the Union. He replied that the city stood no chance, but should aim to be South Africa's largest educational centre.
This has led to Potchefstroom's being the "city of expertise", with numerous tertiary educational institutions. It has hosted the annual late-September Aardklop Arts Festival, a predominantly-Afrikaans arts festival, since 1997.

Population
The Potchefstroom Municipality, which encompasses several neighbouring settlements, had a population of 128,357 in the 2007 community survey. Of these, 69.6 percent were white, 27.0 percent were black, three percent were coloureds and 0.4 percent were Asian. However, the city itself and surrounding suburbs have a population of 43,448, of which 69.9 percent are white, 25.4 percent are black, 2.8 percent were coloured and 1.3 percent were Asian.

Ken McArthur of Potchefstroom won a gold medal at the 1912 Stockholm Olympics in the marathon. McArthur was known in his home village of North Antrim for his training routine, which consisted of racing a narrow-gauge train.

Education
Potchefstroom is home to five tertiary institutions, 30 other schools and a number of research bureaus and training centres, including:
The North-West University, a merged tertiary institution which was created on 1 January 2004, with campuses in Potchefstroom, Mafikeng and Vanderbijlpark. The Potchefstroom Campus (formerly the Potchefstroomse Universiteit vir Christelike Hoër Onderwys, founded in 1869) is the largest, and the university's head office is located there. The North-West University became one of South Africa's larger universities after the merger, with about 32,000 full-time and distance-education students.
The Potchefstroom College of Education (originally the Normal College), which was founded in 1919. The college was originally housed in galvanised-iron buildings on the same premises as the Potchefstroom High School for Boys, and moved to its present location in 1923. The College of Education was incorporated by the university on 1 January 2001.
The Technical College Potchefstroom, founded in 1939 when the Union Education Department began "continuation classes".
The Agricultural Centre, previously known as the Experimental Farm (1902) and Agricultural College (1939), is the largest agricultural facility in one location in southern Africa. The centre houses the headquarters of the Highveld Region of the Department of Agriculture, the Grain Crops Institute, and the Agricultural College. The Potchefstroom Koekoek chicken was developed there.
Potchefstroom Akademie, founded in 1981 by Tina Schöltz, offers tertiary education in somatology, health and skincare therapy, holistic health therapies and interior design and decorating.
Potchefstroom High School for Girls: Originally known as the Central School, it was established in 1874. Girls High was founded in 1905, when the Central School was divided into separate high schools for boys and girls.
Potchefstroom High School for Boys, established in 1874, has been at its current site since 1905.
HTS Potchefstroom, founded in January 1903
Potchefstroom Central Primary School, the city's only English-speaking primary school
Hoër Volkskool Potchefstroom, founded in 1927
Laerskool President Pretorius, founded in 1897
Potchefstroom Gimnasium, founded in 1907
Public primary and high schools in Potchefstroom's townships include Boitirelo Primary School, Lesego Primary School, Boitshoko High School and Tlokwe High School.

Sports facilities
Potchefstroom, known as the North West Province's "Home of Sport", is the provincial headquarters of 17 major sports. The city council emphasises the establishment, maintenance and upgrading of its sports facilities, particularly to meet the sporting and recreational needs of its youth. The Mooi River and other trails add colour and variety to facilities available to residents and tourists.

Potchefstroom has hosted two World Cup-winning teams (in cricket and football), and is a home away from home for international athletes and teams. At  altitude, it provides a good balance between altitude and quality training. The city has no large factories, and good air quality. Athletes and professional teams train at the North-West University's High Performance Institute of Sport.

Cricket is popular, with Senwes Park the home ground of the Highveld Lions. During the 2003 Cricket World Cup, Potchefstroom hosted matches between Australia and the Netherlands, Australia and Namibia, and South Africa and Kenya. Potchefstroom co-hosted the 2009 Cricket World Cup Qualifier. The South Africa national cricket team has regularly chosen Potchefstroom for off-season training and has hosted the Australian team's off-season cricket camps. During the 2003 Cricket World Cup, Australia's cricket team chose Potchefstroom as their home base and won the tournament.

Rugby is arguably Potchefstroom's most popular sport. Olën Park, the main rugby stadium, is primarily used for rugby union matches by the Leopards in the Vodacom Cup and the first division of the Currie Cup. The stadium is also used for football matches, and has hosted the South Africa under-23 team. Jomo Cosmos, a Premier Soccer League, team relegated to the National First Division, also uses the stadium for some matches. Profert Olën Park was named after Carl Ludwig Theodor Olën, president of the Western Transvaal Rugby Union between 1922 and 1934. Profert, a local fertiliser company, maintains the playing field.

The Absa Puk Oval is on the North-West University campus. The university sport grounds is known as the Fanie du Toit Sports Complex. The main rugby field has hosted several Leopards games and the Potchefstroom Campus' Varsity Cup matches.

PUC McArthur Stadium, the athletics stadium, was renovated for the fourth time in 2014. Built in 1892, it was named in honour of 1912 Olympic marathon gold medalist Ken McArthur. Noted local athletes include Godfrey Khotso Mokoena, the silver medalist in the long jump at the 2008 Beijing Summer Olympic Games, Hezekiél Sepeng, Jorrie Muller, Justine Robbeson and Ryan Diedericks.

The visit of the Spain national football team during the 2010 FIFA World Cup brought a new level of sport to Potchefstroom and the NWU. Spain, who won their inaugural FIFA World Cup title, chose Potchefstroom as their base camp. A new sports complex was built at the North-West University for the team, and the local airport was expanded to accommodate large passenger planes.

Politics

Mayor Maphetle Maphetle of the African National Congress was dismissed in late 2012 after a motion of no confidence passed, and Annette Combrink of the opposition Democratic Alliance was elected mayor. Three months later a motion of no confidence removed Combrink, and Maphetle was reinstated. Since then, municipal-council and mayoral elections have been keenly contested.

Attractions

Listed monuments

Since the Heritage Resources Act of 1999, monuments are classified as grade I (national), II (provincial) and III (local). Many national monuments were downgraded to grade II.

Grade I : National Heritage Sites

Grade II: Provincial Heritage Sites

Provisional grade-III sites
Although Potchefstroom has no local heritage sites, the following sites have been placed on the municipality's provisional list:

 Snowflake Silo building, Wolmarans Street (c. 1921)
 Boyd House, at the corner of Walter Sisulu Avenue and Ayers Street (c. 1909)
 Piet Malan House, 57 Steve Biko Avenue (c. 1890)
 Kohinoor Cinema, Walter Sisulu Avenue (c. 1950): The cinema, in Makweteng (now known as Mieder Park), was built in the early 1950s and in use during the 1950s, 1960s and 1970s. It was also used for dancing competitions (particularly ballroom dancing) and weddings before the forced removals from 1958 to 1963. It hosted jazz concerts with performers such as the Twist Rovers, Spokes Mashiane and other groups from Johannesburg.
 Potchefstroom Dam and Lakeside Resort, Calderbank Avenue (c. 1908)
 Calderbank Building, Walter Sisulu Avenue (c. 1930)
 A. M. E. Church, Ikageng (c. 1961)
 House of the Editor-Bate, James Maroka Avenue (c. 1902)
 Triomf (Knock) Fertilizer (c. 1968)
 Potchefstroom Station building (c. 1919) and steam locomotive on its forecourt, from 1902
 Potchefstroom Synagogue, James Maroka Avenue (c. 1920): The building houses the Potchefstroom Academy.
 Devil's corner, Ikageng (c. 1960): An open space used by the Ikageng community, during the 1960s it was used for a fashion parade and is now a celebration venue for the Kaizer Chiefs Football Club. Local criminals used it as a hiding place, and it was a meeting place for local activists and organisations.
 Tlokwe Memorial Park, entrance to Ikageng (c. 2009): A memorial park under construction for local activists who died during the liberation struggle
 Cachet Park, Die Bult (c. 1900): Used for the annual Aardklop National Arts Festival

Other places of interest
Boskop Dam Nature Réserve 
Boskop Wild Animal Park
O. P. M. Prozesky Bird Sanctuary
Dome Bergland Nature Park, site of a meteorite impact
The Trim Park, in the Green Belt area adjacent to the Mooi River
The North-West University Botanical Garden, adjacent to the university's Potchefstroom, covers an area of almost . Most of its plants are indigenous, except for a few exotic plants of botanical (or medicinal) interest. A section around a man-made ridge is a natural field garden, and the rest is more intensively managed. A variety of mammals, birds, amphibians and fish have made the garden their home in recent years.
The country's oldest Reformed Churches and its oldest stone-built Hervormde Church are in the town. St Mary's Anglican Church, built in 1891, is notable for its stained-glass windows. The N. G. Moedergemeente building burnt down in July 2007, and has been restored.
The Witrand Mental Institute, the second government institution for psychiatric patients, opened in 1923; the first, Valkenberg Hospital, opened in Maitland in the Cape.
Potchefstroom Museum
MooiRivier Mall, a shopping mall, opened early in 2008 with over 100 stores and food and entertainment facilities overlooking the Mooi River. The mall provides shopping facilities for surrounding towns, such as Carletonville, Ventersdorp, Parys and Fochville.
Newly re-formed mosque (2007)

Economy
Potchefstroom is an industrial, service and agricultural growth point of North West province. Industries include steel, food, and chemical processing. The chicken industry is important, and companies around the city include Chubby Chick, Serfontein Poultry, Haagner's Poultry, Crown Chicken and Highveld Egg Cooperative.

Military

The city plays an important role with the South African National Defence Force, hosting the provincial command headquarters. Potchefstroom regularly holds military displays and parades. The city had an airfield used by the South African Air Force which was closed in budget cuts after the end of apartheid.

References

Bibliography
The Story of Potchefstroom. Geoffrey Jenkins, AA Balkema, Cape Town. 2nd ed. 1971. 120 pages.

External links

 Potchefstroom Centenary (1939) from the AP Archive.
 www.potchefstroom.info

 
1838 establishments in South Africa
Populated places established in 1838
Potchefstroom
Populated places in the JB Marks Local Municipality
Second Boer War concentration camps
Former republics